Hyposmocoma palmivora is a species of moth of the family Cosmopterigidae. It was first described by Edward Meyrick in 1928. It is endemic to the Hawaiian island of Kauai.

The larvae feed on Pritchardia eriophora. The naked larvae were found feeding amongst the abundant yellowish cottony tomentum on undersides of leaves.

External links

palmivora
Endemic moths of Hawaii
Moths described in 1928